= Cuchilla de Belén =

Hill range in Uruguay

Coordinates: 30°55′00″S 56°30′00″W

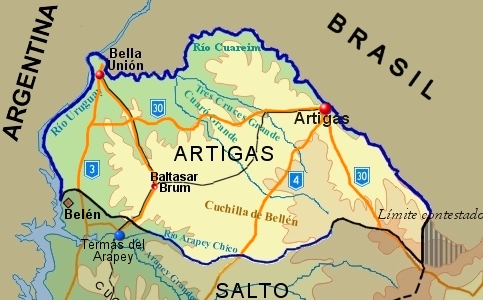
The Cuchilla de Belén on the map.

The Cuchilla de Belén (Bethlehem Range) is a low range of hills located in the north of Uruguay. It climbs no more than 345 m in height.

It is part of the basaltic peneplain in most of its course, made up of extrusive igneous rocks of the Arapey Formation, so it represents elongated and flattened shapes in its summits. The western terminal section is made up of sedimentary rocks, with a topography made up of hills. In this area, mixed agro-livestock economies are developed, while in the rest of the area extensive livestock farming predominates with rice fields.
